The San Marino and Rimini Riviera Grand Prix is a motorcycling event that is part of the World Motorcycle Racing season. The name of the race is a misnomer as the race has always taken place in Italy, but because there is already an Italian motorcycle Grand Prix, it was called the San Marino Grand Prix because of the track location's proximity to San Marino. The event is due to take place at the Misano World Circuit Marco Simoncelli until at least 2026.

History
The inaugural San Marino Grand Prix was held in 1981 at the Autodromo Dino Ferrari, then moved to the Autodromo Internazionale del Mugello for the 1982 race. In 1983, they returned to the Autodromo Dino Ferrari and in 1984 they once again returned to the Autodromo Internazionale del Mugello. From the 1985 season onwards the venue hosting the San Marino round was the Circuito Internazionale Santa Monica.

The round was taken off the calendar in 1988 but got added back in 1991, this time on the Autodromo Internazionale del Mugello. The round was not present in 1992 due to Bernie Ecclestone and the IRTA meddling with the selected grands prix chosen (see the FIM–IRTA war for more information on that) but returned in the 1993 on the same venue as before.

After that, the San Marino round was taken off the calendar for the 1994 season and it would take 13 years before the San Marino race would return in the 2007 season, where it has stayed on the calendar ever since.

Official names and sponsors
1981, 1991, 1993: Gran Premio di San Marino (no official sponsor)
1982, 1984–1986: Gran Premio San Marino (no official sponsor)
1983: Gran Premio S. Marino (no official sponsor)
1987: Grand Prix San Marino (no official sponsor)
2007–2009: Gran Premio Cinzano di San Marino e Della Riviera di Rimini
2010–2013: Gran Premio Aperol di San Marino e Riviera di Rimini
2014–2016: Gran Premio TIM di San Marino e della Riviera di Rimini
2017–2018: Gran Premio Tribul Mastercard di San Marino e della Riviera di Rimini
2019, 2021: Gran Premio Octo di San Marino e della Riviera di Rimini
2020: Gran Premio Lenovo di San Marino e della Riviera di Rimini
2022: Gran Premio Gryfyn di San Marino e della Riviera di Rimini

Winners of the San Marino motorcycle Grand Prix

Multiple winners (riders)

Multiple winners (manufacturers)

By year

References

 San Marino motorcycle Grand Prix
Recurring sporting events established in 1981
1981 establishments in Italy